Jaenimonas is a genus of trypanosomatid parasite that infects mushroom-feeding Drosophila, similar to Crithidia parasites of Bumblebees. Jaenimonas drosophilae is the sole representative of this genus. The genus is named in honor of John Jaenike, a prominent ecologist and evolutionary biologist whose work on mushroom-feeding flies laid the foundation for studies on mycophagous Drosophila. Jaenike was also an early proponent of the Red Queen hypothesis.

References 

Trypanosomatida
Parasitic excavates
Taxa described in 2015